Bruno Côté (August 10, 1940 – June 30, 2010) was a Canadian landscape painter.

Biography 

Bruno Côté was born in Quebec City in August 1940. His youth in a family where art held a strong significance encouraged the development of his artistic talents. He joined the family's publicity business in 1957. In 1978 he moved to Baie-Saint-Paul, where he held his first important solo exhibition. In 1980 he began to travel, painting landscapes in many different regions of Canada.
Bruno Côté is represented by art galleries across Canada. Such art galleries have been for example, in the Chateau Laurier hotel of Ottawa Canada. In 2008 the Canadian Parliament gave Côté's painting, The Portage Trail to the Parliament of Scotland to mark the opening of the Scottish Parliament Building.

Côté died on June 30, 2010 in Baie-Saint-Paul, after prostate cancer had metastasized.

Public collections 

 Ambassade de Corée
 Canadian Embassy of the Federal Republic of Germany
 American Embassy, Ottawa
 Centre National d'exposition Baie‑St‑Paul
 Confederation Art Gallery and Museum, Charlottetown
 Johns Hopkins University, Baltimore, U.S.A
 Musée D'Art Contemporain de Montréal (collection Lavalin)
 Musée de Charlevoix
 Musée des beaux-arts de Montréal
 Musée Marc-Aurèle Fortin, Montréal
 United Nations, New York
 Scottish Parliament, Edinburg, Scotland
 Simon Fraser University Gallery, Vancouver
 Université Laval
 University of New Brunswick

Publications

References 

 Canadian Heritage
 A Dictionary of Canadian Artists - volumes 1-8 by Colin S. MacDonald, and volume 9 (online only), by Anne Newlands and Judith Parker, National Gallery of Canada / Musée des beaux-arts du Canada
 Library and Archives Canada

External links 
  official website of Bruno Côté
 art gallery representing Bruno Côté

20th-century Canadian painters
Canadian male painters
21st-century Canadian painters
1940 births
2010 deaths
Artists from Quebec City
Deaths from prostate cancer
Deaths from cancer in Quebec
20th-century Canadian male artists
21st-century Canadian male artists